This is a list of educational institutions in Kozhikode District.

Major campuses
 Indian Institute of Management Kozhikode (IIM Calicut) 
Govt Medical College Calicut
National Institute of Technology Calicut (NIT Calicut)

Arts and Science Colleges 

College of Applied Science IHRD, Kozhikode
 Farook College
 Markaz Arts and Science College
 Malabar Christian College
Holy cross Institute of Management and Technology
 St. Joseph's College, Devagiri
 Zamorin's Guruvayurappan College
 R. Shankar Memorial Arts and Science College
 Government Arts & Science College, Meenchantha
 AWH Special College, Kozhikode
 SNG College Chelannur
 Government College, Madappally
 Providence Women's College
College of Applied Science, Thamarassery
 Govt. College, Kodanchery
 Govt. College, Kunnamangalam
 Govt. College, Koduvally
 Govt. College, Balussery
 M Dasan Arts & Science College Ulliyeri
 KMO Arts & Science College, Koduvally
 MES Arts & Science College, Chathamangalam
 National College of Arts & Science, Puliyavu
Dayapuram Arts and Science College for Women
MAMO College Manassery
Don Bosco college Mampetta
Sree Gokulam Arts And Science College
College Of Applied Science Thiruvambady, Mukkam
College Of Applied Science Thiruvambady
College Of Applied Science Nadhapuram
St saviors College Eranhipalam

Engineering colleges 
 National Institute of Technology Calicut
 Government Engineering College, Kozhikode
 Co-operative Institute of Technology, Vatakara
 AWH Engineering College
 KMCT College of Engineering
 M Dasan Institute Of Technology, Ulliyeri

Law colleges 
 Government Law College, Kozhikode
 Markaz Law College

Medical colleges 
 Govt Medical College Kozhikode
 Government Homoeopathic Medical College Kozhikode
 KMCT Medical College Manassery
 Malabal Medical College Modakkalloor

Management institutes
 Indian Institute of Management Kozhikode
Farook Institute of Management Studies
Malabar Academy For Management Studies
Camford Institute Of Management
IIKM Business School(West Hill)
School Of Management Studies, Kozhikode
SNES Institute of Management Studies And Research (IMSAR)
Edu Mould College of Management Studies
Saga Institute Of Management Studies
Tourfed Academy For Management Studies
SNES College of Arts Commerce & Management, Calicut

Other organizations
 Kerala School of Mathematics, Kozhikode
 Indian Institute of Spices Research
 THE OXFORD SCHOOL CALICUT/ https://oxfordkollam.edu.in/about-us-2/
 Zoological Survey of India
 National Institute of Communicable Diseases
 National Institute of Electronics and Information Technology
 National College of Pharmacy, Manassery
 NIRDESH Shipbuilding Institute
 Footwear Design and Development Institute Upcoming
Altus Institute of Higher Education
 Cindrebay School of Design

Image gallery

References

Institutions
Kozhikode